Usha Ranjan Ghatak (1931–2005) was an Indian synthetic organic chemist, stereochemist and the director of the Indian Association for the Cultivation of Science (IACS). He was known for his contributions in developing novel protocols of stereoselective synthesis of diterpenoids. He was an elected fellow of the Indian Academy of Sciences and the Indian National Science Academy. The Council of Scientific and Industrial Research, the apex agency of the Government of India for scientific research, awarded him the Shanti Swarup Bhatnagar Prize for Science and Technology, one of the highest Indian science awards, in 1974, for his contributions to chemical sciences.

Biography 

U. R. Ghatak was born on 26 February 1931 at Brahmanbaria, a town of historic importance in the undivided Bengal of British India (presently in Bangladesh) to Hem Ranjan Ghatak-Soudamini Devi couple as one among their seven children. He did his schooling locally and after passing matriculation examination in 1947, he completed his intermediate studies in Agartala in 1949. His graduate studies (BSc hons) were at Asutosh College in chemistry and secured his master's degree from Rajabazar Science College in 1953, winning Motilal Mullick Medal and University Gold Medal for standing first in the examination. Subsequently, he enrolled for doctoral studies at Indian Association for the Cultivation of Science (IACS) and studied under the guidance of P. C. Dutta, a synthetic organic chemist, and obtained a PhD from Rajabazar Science College, Calcutta University in 1957. He stayed with IACS for two more years before moving to the US for his post-doctoral studies at three centres viz. University of Maine, the University of California, Berkeley and St. John’s University. He returned to India to IACS in 1963 to resume his career there and worked there till his official retirement from service in 1996; in between, he served as the head of the department of organic chemistry (1977–89) and as the director (1989–96). Later, he was associated with the Indian Institute of Chemical Biology as an INSA Senior Scientist.

Ghatak was married to Anindita and the couple lived in Kolkata. It was here he died, succumbing a massive heart attack, on 18 June 2005, at the age of 76, survived by his wife.

Legacy 
Ghatak's contributions were primarily on stereochemically controlled organic synthesis and he was known developing methodologies for the synthesis of polycarbocyclic diterpenoids and bridged-ring compounds. His work on the four possible racemates of deoxypodocarpic acid, deisopropyl dehydroabietic acid and the corresponding 5-epimers reportedly clarified some of the stereochemical uncertainties existed till then. He demonstrated total synthesis of compounds related to gibberellins, a group of growth-regulating plant hormones. The regio- and stereo-specific intramolecular alkylation rearrangements through diazoketones as well as new annulation reactions involving cationic and radical processes he developed widened the understanding of free radical cyclization chemistry.

Ghatak documented his researches by way of a book, A Century, 1876-1976 and a number of articles published in peer-reviewed journals; ResearchGate, an online article repository, has listed 148 of them. He mentored several doctoral scholars in their researches and his works have been cited by several authors. He was associated with journals such as Indian Journal of Chemistry (Sec B), Proceedings of Indian Academy of Sciences (Chem Sci) and Proceedings of the Indian National Science Academy as a member of their editorial boards and served as a member of the Indian National Science Academy Council from 1994 to 1996.

Awards and honors 
The Council of Scientific and Industrial Research awarded Ghatak the Shanti Swarup Bhatnagar Prize, one of the highest Indian science awards, in 1974. The Indian Academy of Sciences elected him as a fellow in 1976 and he became a fellow of the Indian National Science Academy in 1980. The Chemical Research Society of India awarded him the Lifetime Achievement Award in 2003. Among the several award orations he delivered were Professor K. Venkataraman Endowment Lecture (1982), Acharya P. C. Ray Memorial Lecture of Indian Chemical Society (1985), Professor N. V. Subba Rao Memorial Lecture (1986), Prof. R. C. Shah Memorial Lecture of Indian Science Congress Association (1986), T. R. Sheshadri Memorial Lecture of Delhi University (1987), Baba Kartar Singh Memorial Lecture of Panjab University (1990) and S. Swaminathan Sixtieth Birthday Commemoration Lecture of Indian National Science Academy (1994). He was also associated with the Royal Society of Chemistry and Chemical Society of London as an associate member. The Indian Association for the Cultivation of Science have instituted an annual oration, Professor U. R. Ghatak Endowment Lecture, in honor of Ghatak.

Citations

Selected bibliography

Books

Articles

See also 
 Gibberellin

Notes

References

External links

Further reading 
 

Recipients of the Shanti Swarup Bhatnagar Award in Chemical Science
1931 births
2005 deaths
Bengali scientists
Asutosh College alumni
University of Calcutta alumni
University of Maine alumni
University of California, Berkeley alumni
Alumni of St John's College, Oxford
Indian organic chemists
Indian scientific authors
Fellows of the Indian Academy of Sciences
Fellows of the Indian National Science Academy
Stereochemists
20th-century Indian chemists
Scientists from West Bengal